Tan Tan Airport (
) , also known as Plage Blanche Airport, is an airport near Tan Tan, a city in the Guelmim-Oued Noun region in Morocco. The airport is used for military and civil aviation.

Facilities
It has the following radio-navigation aids: NDB and VOR. The runway is suitable for light (private) jets and turbo-prop aircraft.

Airlines and destinations
The following airlines operate regular scheduled and charter flights at Tan Tan Airport:

Statistics

Accidents and incidents
On July 26, 2011, A Royal Moroccan Armed Forces Hercules C-130 transport plane crashed six miles from the airport, where it had planned a stop-over on a flight from Dakhla to Kenitra.  All six crew, 60 soldiers, and 12 civilians on board died

References

External links
 
 

Airports in Morocco
Guelmim-Oued Noun